Harry Brittain Fry (September 13, 1905 – 1985) was a Canadian rower who competed in the 1932 Summer Olympics and in the 1936 Summer Olympics.

At the 1930 Empire Games he won the bronze medal with the Canadian boat in the eights competition. In 1932 he was a crew member of the Canadian boat which won the bronze medal in the Olympic eights event. Four years later he was eliminated with the Canadian boat in the repêchage of the 1936 eights competition.

Fry was born and died in Dundas, Ontario.

External links
sports-reference.com

1905 births
1985 deaths
Rowers from Hamilton, Ontario
Canadian male rowers
Olympic rowers of Canada
Rowers at the 1932 Summer Olympics
Rowers at the 1936 Summer Olympics
Olympic bronze medalists for Canada
Rowers at the 1930 British Empire Games
Commonwealth Games bronze medallists for Canada
Olympic medalists in rowing
Medalists at the 1932 Summer Olympics
Commonwealth Games medallists in rowing
20th-century Canadian people
Medallists at the 1930 British Empire Games